Richard Cope was a minister.

Richard Cope may also refer to:

Sir Richard Cope, 9th Baronet (died 1806)
Richard Whittaker Cope, designer of the Albion press

See also
Cope (surname)